The Tilyar Mini Zoo, Rohtak is located inside the Tilyar Lake complex on Delhi Road in Rohtak, Haryana, India. This Zoo was built in year 1987.

The Tilyar Zoo at Rohtak is 42 km from Delhi border and the zoo is well maintained, Tilyar Lake (entry free for the lake) and Tilyar Zoo are worth visiting specially for families. Fishing is permissible at Tilyar Lake after paying INR200 fishing fee.

Mini zoo

Haryana had many mini zoos spread across the state. In 2001 the Government of Haryana decided to shut these down and replace them with well developed viable zoos, this included setting up the zoo at Rohtak within Tilyar Lake complex.

As a result, enclosures for housing animals and aviaries for birds were built. Visitor facilities such as landscaping, walkways and trials, gardens, hillocks, lakes, artificial waterfalls, cafe, visitor toilets and resting shelters, watch towers, drinking water facilities, etc. were created.

The following animals have been housed in this zoo:

 Tiger 
 Leopard
 Fox
 Hyena
 Wolf
 Gharial
 Mugger
 Jackal
 Otter
 Pig-tailed monkey
 Baboon 
 Bonnet macaque
 Gray langur
 Sambhar
 Blackbuck
 Chinkara
 Indian hog deer
 Barking deer
 Guineafowl
 Silver pheasant
 Fantail pigeon
 Cockatiel
 Zebra finch

Updates related to zoos in Haryana 
 Deer Park, Hisar, founded in 1970-71, is oldest among zoos and deer parks in Haryana
 Haryana is now left with five tigers in captivity: two each in Mini Zoo, Bhiwani and Rohtak Zoo and one in Pipali Zoo
 In 2003, a baby baboon was born in captivity in Pipali Zoo
 In 2009, tiger Apaya of Bhiwani zoo attacked and killed a tigress.
 In 2011, tiger Apaya of Bhiwani zoo entered the enclosure of another tigress Rani and attacked her. Rani died and was buried on the zoo premises. 
 In 2011 another tiger Brondis had killed a caretaker in Bhiwani zoo. 
 In 2014, 43 private school kids who were visiting Bhiwnai zoo were attacked by bees.
 In 2019, Rohtak Zooo gets Two leopards – a four-year-old Varsha and a three-and-a-half-year-old Pawan

Gallery
Species found at the zoo (pictures for representation only).

References

External links
Video of Rohtak Zoo is here and another video of tiger there is here.
A travelogue collage of pictures is available here

Wildlife sanctuaries in Haryana
Tourism in Haryana
Zoos in Haryana
Rohtak
Rohtak district